Novobaskakovo (Yañı Baśqaq) is a rural locality (a village) in Starogumerovsky Selsoviet, Kushnarenkovsky District, Bashkortostan, Russia. The population was 7 as of 2010. There are 3 streets.

Geography 
Novobaskakovo is located 45 km south of Kushnarenkovo (the district's administrative centre) by road. Sultanayevo is the nearest rural locality.

References 

Rural localities in Kushnarenkovsky District